Moving Home is the debut release from English band Moose Blood. It was released on Fist in the Air Records in February 2013.

Track listing

Personnel
Adapted via Bandcamp.

Moose Blood
 Eddy Brewerton – vocals, guitar
 Mark E. Osborne – guitar
 Sam Bradford – bass
 Glenn Harvey – drums

References

2013 EPs
Moose Blood EPs